("Furthermore, I consider that Carthage must be destroyed"), often abbreviated to  ("Carthage must be destroyed"), is a Latin oratorical phrase pronounced by Cato the Censor, a politician of the Roman Republic. The phrase originates from debates held in the Roman Senate prior to the Third Punic War (149–146 BC) between Rome and Carthage. Cato is said to have used the phrase as the conclusion to all his speeches to push for the war.

Grammatical analysis
The phrase employs , the feminine singular gerundive form of the verb  ("to destroy"). The gerundive (or future passive participle)  is a verbal adjective that may be translated as "to be destroyed".  When combined with a form of the verb  ("to be"), it adds an element of compulsion or necessity, yielding "is to be destroyed", or, as it is more commonly rendered, "must be destroyed". The gerundive  functions as a predicative adjective in this construction, which is known as the passive periphrastic.

The short form of the phrase, is an independent clause. Consequently,  the feminine singular subject noun  appears in the nominative case. The verb  functions as a copula—linking the subject noun  to the predicative verbal adjective —and further imports a deontic modality to the clause as a whole.

The fuller forms  and  use the so-called accusative and infinitive construction for the indirect statement. In each of these forms, the verb  ("I opine") sets up the indirect statement  ("[that] Carthage is to be destroyed").

Historical background
Although Rome was successful in the first two Punic Wars, as it vied for dominance with the seafaring Punic city-state of Carthage in North Africa (now Tunisia), it suffered a number of humiliations and damaging reverses in the course of these engagements, especially at the Battle of Cannae in 216 BC. Rome nonetheless managed to win the Second Punic War thanks to Scipio Africanus in 201 BC. After its defeat, Carthage ceased to be a threat to Rome and was reduced to a small territory that was equivalent to what is now northeastern Tunisia.

However, Cato the Censor visited Carthage in 152 BC as a member of a senatorial embassy, which was sent to arbitrate a conflict between the Punic city and Massinissa, the king of Numidia. Cato, a veteran of the Second Punic War, was shocked by Carthage's wealth, which he considered dangerous for Rome. He then relentlessly called for its destruction and ended all of his speeches with the phrase, even when the debate was on a completely different matter. The Senate refused to follow him though, especially Publius Cornelius Scipio Nasica Corculum, the son-in-law of Scipio Africanus and the most influential senator. Corculum opposed the war to preserve Roman unity and argued that the fear of a common enemy was necessary to keep the people in check. Like Cato, he ended all his speeches with the same phrase, "Carthage must be saved" (Carthago servanda est).

Cato finally won the debate after Carthage had attacked Massinissa, which gave a casus belli to Rome since the peace treaty of 201 BC prevented Carthage from declaring war without Rome's assent. In 146 BC, Carthage was razed by Scipio Aemilianus, Africanus's grandson, and its entire remaining population was sold into slavery. Africa then became a Roman province. The notion that Roman forces then sowed the city with salt is a 19th-century invention.

Historical literary sources
No ancient source gives the phrase exactly as it is usually quoted in modern times. Its current form was made by English and French scholars at the turn of the 18th and 19th centuries, while German scholars have used the longer "".  Ancient authors quote the phrase as follow:

Pliny the Elder, in his Natural History: ""
Aurelius Victor in his De viris illustribus: ""
Florus, in his Epitome of Livy: ""

Therefore, Pliny the Elder, Florus and the Pseudo Aurelius Victor quote the phrase  in indirect speech.

Instead, only a paraphrastic translation is the Greek rendering of the Catonian phrase by Plutarch in his Life of Cato the Elder, 27: "" ("Videtur et hoc mihi, Carthaginem non debere esse"—"It seems to me that Carthage must not longer exist").

Modern usage
The phrase is sometimes fully adopted in modern usage and sometimes paraphrased, as a learned reference to total warfare. In 1673, the English minister Anthony Ashley Cooper, 1st Earl of Shaftesbury revived the phrase in the form "" in a speech before Parliament during the Third Anglo-Dutch War, comparing England to Rome and the Dutch Republic to Carthage. In the 1890s, the London newspaper Saturday Review published several articles that expressed an anti-German sentiment, summed up in the quote  ("Germany must be destroyed"). In 1899, the Russian writer Leo Tolstoy retained the phrase's form "" for the title of a pacifist essay condemning war and militarism published in the liberal London newspaper The Westminster Gazette. Jean Hérold-Paquis, a broadcaster on the German-controlled Radio Paris in occupied France between 1940 and 1944 had "England, like Carthage, shall be destroyed!" as his catchphrase.

The phrase was used as the title for Alan Wilkins' 2007 play on the Third Punic War, and for a book about Carthaginian history by Richard Miles.

In a modern meaning, the syntagma "" used by itself refers to an often reiterated statement, usually a core belief of the one issuing it.

Words of Cato the Elder were often paraphrased by Polish eurosceptic member of the eighth European Parliament, Janusz Korwin-Mikke. At the end of his speeches, Mikke would often conclude with the words: "And besides, I believe that the European Union should be destroyed." (A poza tym sądzę, że Unia Europejska powinna zostać zniszczona") 

Former Dutch politician Marianne Thieme, once lead candidate for the Party for the Animals, always concluded her speeches in Parliament with the phrase: "Furthermore we are of the opinion that factory farming has to be ended" (""), referring to Carthago delenda est.

See also 
 Ad nauseam
 List of Latin phrases
 Carthaginian peace
 Genocide
 Debellatio
 Proof by assertion

Notes

References

Bibliography

Ancient sources 

 Aurelius Victor, .
 Diodorus Siculus,  ("Historical Library").
 Florus, Epitome.
 Gaius Plinius Secundus (Pliny the Elder),  ("Natural History").
 Plutarch, Parallel Lives.

Modern sources 

 F. E. Adcock, "'Delenda est Carthago'", in The Cambridge Historical Journal, Vol. 8, No. 3 (1946), pp. 117–128.
 Alan E. Astin, Cato the Censor, Oxford University Press, 1978.
 John F. Miller & A. F. Woodman (editors), Latin Historiography and Poetry in the Early Empire, Leiden/Boston, Brill, 2010.
 Ellen O'Gorman, "Cato the elder and the destruction of Carthage", in Helios 31 (2004), pp. 96–123.
Little, Charles E. “The Authenticity and Form of Cato’s Saying ‘Carthago Delenda Est.’” The Classical Journal, vol. 29, no. 6 (1934), pp. 429–35.
 

 
 Silvia Thürlemann, "Ceterum censeo Carthaginem esse delendam", Gymnasium 81 (1974), pp. 465–476.
 Ursula Vogel-Weidemann, "Carthago delenda est: Aita and Prophasis", in Acta Classica XXXII (1989), pp. 79–95.

Carthage
Latin political words and phrases
Latin quotations
Third Punic War
Genocide
Hate speech